Han Myeong-sook (born March 24, 1944) was the Prime Minister of South Korea from April 2006 to March 2007. She is South Korea's first female prime minister (second female prime minister overall if the acting premiership of Chang Sang is included). She was from the United New Democratic Party (UNDP) as a member of the Korean National Assembly (representative) for Ilsan-gab, and is a graduate of Ewha Womans University in Seoul with a degree in French literature. She resigned as Prime Minister on March 7, 2007 and declared her presidential candidacy. But she did not succeed in the nominations. In 2008 she ran for  parliament, but was not elected. However, in January 2012 she was elected leader of the main oppositional Democratic United Party (DUP) before the April legislative elections and became a member of parliament. But the liberals did not manage to defeat the ruling Saenuri Party and Han stepped down as party leader in April 2012. In August 2015, Han was convicted of receiving illegal donations and sentenced to two years in prison. Han has maintained her innocence. In 2021, she was granted special amnesty by the government and her constitutional rights were restored.

Pre-Prime Ministerial career
She was imprisoned from 1979 to 1981 after she confessed to teaching pro-Communist ideas to workers, farmers and low-income women, but it is now accepted she was imprisoned for pro-Democratic activities. A government committee exonerated her of any wrongdoing in 2001, ruling her confession was elicited through torture.

In 1999, she joined the National Congress for New Politics, and entered politics. In 2000, she was elected as a member of the 16th Korean National Assembly (for Proportional representation). In 2004, she ran for a member of the National Assembly in Ilsan of Goyang and was elected.

Han was the first Minister of Gender Equality, serving from 2001 to 2003. She served as the Minister of Environment from 2003 to 2004.

Appointment
On 24 March 2006, following the resignation of Prime Minister Lee Hae-chan, President Roh Moo-hyun nominated Han to become the first female Prime Minister of South Korea. Han is only the second woman to be nominated for the Prime Ministership. On 20 April 2006, Han Myeong-Sook was sworn in, becoming the first female Prime Minister of South Korea.

Prime Ministership

Libya-South Korea relations

Han visited Libya on 19 September 2006 and 20 September 2006.

South Korea-United Arab Emirates relations
Han went to the United Arab Emirates on 24 September and held high level talks with Prime Minister Mohammed bin Rashid Al Maktoum. Han said she wanted to cultivate "the potential for bilateral cooperation in... trade, investment, IT and tourism." According to Han, "around 50 South Korean companies of global competitiveness have established headquarters of the Middle East region in Dubai." UAE companies invested $8 billion in South Korea from 2002–2006, but South Korea total investment in the UAE is only $25 million.

Han was interviewed by Gulf News in September 2006. She expressed a desire to increase South Korean investment in the UAE and sign a Free Trade Agreement with the Gulf Cooperation Council. When asked about gender equality in the UAE, she expressed interest in Muslim women, and commended the fact that the "status of women in Islam is a historic and religious outcome that is regulated by the Quran and Hadith." She pointed to the efforts of Shaikha Fatima, the mother of the UAE, the appointment of Shaikha Lubna Khalid Al Qasimi, the first appointment of a female minister, as the Minister of Economy, and the February 2006 appointment of Mariam Al Roumi as the Minister of Social Affairs as positive signs of the UAE's adapting to social changes. She rejected the idea of "imposing a U.S. or Western-style democracy on the Arab world" saying, "the values of democracy are not to be imposed." Han expressed her friendship towards Lebanon and Israel and her support for UN Security Council Resolution 1701, UNIFIL, United Nations Secretary-General Kofi Annan's efforts at securing peace, and Foreign Minister Ban's candidacy to be the next Secretary General.-

Kazakhstan-South Korea relations
Han met with Daniyal Akhmetov, the Prime Minister of Kazakhstan, on 23 September 2006 in Astana, Kazakhstan. They signed several bilateral agreements enhancing economic ties. The Government of South Korea agreed to invest an additional $2 billion in joint projects in the energy, uranium-extraction, construction, transportation, and banking sectors. Akhmetov offered South Korea the option of participating in developing a new type of nuclear reactor. South Korean investors have stakes in more than 300 Kazakhstan-based companies. Han was in Kazakhstan until 24 September. She then traveled to Uzbekistan.

Han invited President Nazarbayev to visit South Korea in 2007 on behalf of President Roh, and on 25 September, after talking to Nazarbayev, she announced to the press that he had accepted and expressed hope that the trip would help to increase cooperation in the petrochemical industry, information technology and education/

South Korea-Uzbekistan relations
Han and Shavkat Mirziyoyev, the Prime Minister of Uzbekistan, met in Tashkent, Uzbekistan on 25 September 2006. They signed several agreements, including one deal in which Uzbekistan will send 300 tons of Uzbek uranium ore to South Korea every year from 2010 to 2014. The deal bypasses U.S. companies that acted previously as middlemen for South Korean imports of Uzbek uranium ore. Han also met with President Islam Karimov and parliament speaker Erkin Xalilov. Han and Mirziyoyev boosted cooperation in the energy, agriculture, construction, architecture, and information technology sectors. Trade between South Korea and Uzbekistan increased by nearly 40% between 2005 and 2006, to $565 million.

Resignation

Han resigned from her position as prime minister on March 7, 2007, amidst speculation that she would run in the December 2007 presidential elections.  After the informal meeting with former justice minister Kang Kum-Sil just before her resignation, Han said she would continue as a legislator and think about running for president.

Post-Prime Ministerial career
In 2007, Han ran for the party presidential candidacy but did not succeed in the nominations. She endorsed Chung Dong-young. 
In 2008, she ran for re-election to parliament, but was defeated by a candidate of Grand National Party.
In 2010, she declared to run for Seoul's Mayor position, but was very narrowly defeated by Oh Se-hoon of GNP by less than one percentage point.

On the first congress of the Democratic United Party on 15 January 2012, Han was voted chairwoman of the supreme council of the party with 24.5 per cent support rate. The liberal party was created by a merger of the Democratic Party with the minor Citizens Unity Party, and is South Korea's main oppositional force. Han was elected to parliament in the April legislative elections, but the liberals did not manage to oust the ruling party and Han stepped down as DUP head on 16 April 2012. For three months the leaders of the two major Korean parties were women: Park Geun-hye of the Grand National Party and Han Myeong-sook for the DUP.

References

Further reading
 Skard, Torild (2014) "Han Myung-sook" in Women of power - half a century of female presidents and prime ministers worldwide, Bristol: Policy Press,

External links
Official website of Korean Prime Minister
Biography of Ms. Han

|-

|-

1944 births
Minjoo Party of Korea politicians
Ewha Womans University alumni
Living people
Members of the National Assembly (South Korea)
People from Pyongyang
Prime Ministers of South Korea
South Korean feminists
South Korean politicians convicted of crimes
21st-century South Korean women politicians
21st-century South Korean politicians
United New Democratic Party politicians
Women prime ministers
Women opposition leaders
Cheongju Han clan
Democratic Party (South Korea, 2000) politicians
Heads of government who were later imprisoned
Women government ministers of South Korea
Environment ministers of South Korea
Female members of the National Assembly (South Korea)